Cyana subornata is a moth of the family Erebidae first described by Francis Walker in 1854. It is found in India, Borneo and Sri Lanka.

Description
It has a wingspan of 36 mm. It is characterized by three black spots on its forewings in curved appearance in both sexes. Forewings with the single underside lobe and bands without black edges. Terminal band is not dentate.

References

Moths of Asia
Moths described in 1854